Mount Romnaes is a prominent isolated mountain in Antarctica.

The mountain was mapped by Norwegian cartographers in 1946 from air photos taken by the Lars Christensen Expedition of 1936 - 37, and is named for Nils Romnaes, aerial photographer with this expedition.

References

Mountains of Queen Maud Land
Princess Ragnhild Coast